Lawton is an unincorporated community in Susquehanna County, Pennsylvania, United States. Lawton has a post office with ZIP code 18828.

References

Unincorporated communities in Susquehanna County, Pennsylvania
Unincorporated communities in Pennsylvania